Laestadia is a genus of Latin American flowering plants in the family Asteraceae.

 Species
 Laestadia domingensis Urb. - Dominican Republic 
 Laestadia lechleri Wedd. - Peru
 Laestadia muscicola Sch.Bip. ex Wedd. - Peru
 Laestadia pinifolia Kunth ex Less. - Colombia
 Laestadia rupestris Benth. - Colombia

References

Asteraceae genera
Astereae